Porome, also known as Kibiri, is a Papuan language of southern Papua New Guinea.

Classification
Porome was classified as a language isolate by Stephen Wurm. Although Malcolm Ross linked it to the Kiwaian languages, there is no evidence for a connection apart from the pronouns 1sg amo and 2sg do (cf. proto-Kiwaian *mo and *oro).

Distribution
There are over a thousand speakers in Babaguina, Doibo, Ero, Paile, Tipeowo, and Wowa villages in West Kikori Rural LLG and East Kikori Rural LLG of Gulf Province, near the Aird Hills and Kikori River tributaries.

Phonology
Porome has 9 native consonants. /s/ occurs in loanwords. There are no glottal consonants.

{| class="wikitable"
| p || t || k~g~ɣ
|-
| b || d || 
|-
| v ||  || 
|-
| m || n || 
|-
|  || r || 
|-
|  || (s) || 
|}

There are five vowels, which are /a, e, i, o, u/.

Like the surrounding languages, Porome is a tonal language. It has 5 tones.
High-level: kóí ‘cloth’
Low-level: kòì ‘selfish’
Rising: mèrí ‘road’
Falling: mérì ‘pandanus’
Peaking: pàkúmì ‘feather’

Pronouns
The independent pronouns and subject suffixes to the verb are as follows:

{|
! !!sg!!du!!pl
|-
!1
|amo, -me||amó-kai||amó, -ke/-ki
|-
!2
|do, -ke||aia-kai||a, -ka
|-
!3
|da, -a/-bV||abo-kai||abo, -abo
|}

Vocabulary
Selected Porome vocabulary from Petterson (2010):

Body parts
{| class="wikitable sortable"
! Porome !! Gloss
|-
| kikimi || head
|-
| kikimikuro || hair
|-
| pakai || forehead
|-
| ipiri kukuro || eyebrow, eyelashes
|-
| ipiri || eye
|-
| obokera || ear
|-
| urubi || nose
|-
| koropi || tooth
|-
| beri || tongue
|-
| kakimoro || cheek
|-
| iri || hand
|-
| kaka || thumb
|-
| iri uraka || palm
|-
| upuruburowara || back
|-
| itari || back of neck (nape)
|-
| eimuro || breast
|-
| bamakai || chest
|-
| bakuri || belly
|-
| koupuri || shoulder
|-
| kunei || thigh
|-
| murikara || knee
|-
| warakero || leg
|-
| kakapu || foot
|}

Numerals
{| class="wikitable sortable"
! Porome !! Gloss
|-
| tauri || 0
|-
| wakua || 1
|-
| kabirai || 2
|-
| wauteri || 3
|-
| kaka etekaro || 4
|-
| irikia wakua || 5
|-
| irikia wakua, muro wakua || 6
|-
| irikia wakua, muro kabirai || 7
|-
| irikia wakua, muro wauteri || 8
|-
| irikia wakua, muro kaka etekaro || 9
|-
| irikia kabirai || 10
|}

Village and society
{| class="wikitable sortable"
! Porome !! Gloss
|-
| kuri || village
|-
| mapi || house
|-
| erei || fire
|-
| kumapi || stone
|-
| wawari || creek
|-
| meri || path
|-
| penoni || bridge
|-
| moia || men
|-
| eria || women
|-
| kari || boys
|-
| mibu || girls
|}

Nature and environment
{| class="wikitable sortable"
! Porome !! Gloss
|-
| bari naka || sky
|-
| eri ipiro || sun
|-
| omeri tero || moon
|-
| okoiri || star
|-
| keibu || waves
|-
| momoi || clouds
|-
| bari epu || rain clouds
|-
| kakaikapo, neii || rain
|-
| meremeri || lightning
|-
| marari, konobori || wind
|-
| ero || land
|-
| eii || earth, soil
|-
| ubi || water
|-
| kaku || river
|-
| eimuro || bush
|-
| erouri || island
|-
| moki || passage
|-
| pari || sand
|-
| oteri || cliff
|-
| akaburi || mountain
|}

Plants
{| class="wikitable sortable"
! Porome !! Gloss
|-
| kubi || tree
|-
| aveiri || branch
|-
| kuri || roots
|-
| orei || leaf
|-
| kopo || flower
|-
| enenei || grass
|-
| avui || cutty grass
|-
| makai || betelnut
|-
| dii || coconut
|-
| mei || sugarcane
|}

Animals
{| class="wikitable sortable"
! Porome !! Gloss
|-
| bobi || pig
|-
| kumi || dog
|-
| bari mei kumo || chicken
|-
| kaburi || frog
|-
| barami || wallaby
|-
| pusi || cat
|-
| kuiou || tree kangaroo
|-
| kaiani, keipari || rat
|-
| imai || snake
|-
| boribi || cuscus
|-
| tumaru || bandicoot
|-
| kana || bird-of-paradise
|-
| koropeiri || cassowary
|-
| wamo || bush fowl
|-
| kubeiri || flying fox
|-
| kapasikori || black cockatoo
|-
| marubo || hornbill
|-
| koribi || fish
|-
| einakerei || centipede
|-
| eiamu || millipede
|-
| morokabi || spider
|-
| ubatu || grasshopper
|-
| nepu, mati || mosquito
|-
| nokoiri || fly
|-
| enene || cicada
|-
| bebeiri || butterfly
|-
| aii || sago grub
|-
| buburumi || sago beetle
|-
| mirimabi || scorpion
|-
| mi || crab
|-
| timuri || prawn
|-
| vi || cockle, clam
|-
| keimu || crocodile
|-
| akouri || river snake
|-
| dabeouri || sea turtle
|-
| ketoko || creek turtle
|-
| watemu || river turtle
|}

Comparison
Lexical comparison of Porome with neighboring languages:

{| class="wikitable sortable"
! gloss !! Porome (isolate) !! Urama (Kiwaian) !! Rumu (Turama–Kikorian) !! Ipiko (Anim) !! Folopa (Teberan) !! Baimuru (isolate)
|-
! head
| kikimi / kikima || epu || wotu || abe || topo || uku
|-
! eye
| ipiri / ipiro || idomai || ihi || uhino || kele || inamu
|-
! house
| mapi / mapiro || moto || mi / ve || aho || be || marea
|-
! village
| kuri / kuro || vati || yɔ / ve || vati || be || paʔiri
|-
! place
| dabu / dabo || vati || tei || vati || tiki || paʔiri
|-
! tree
| kubi / kubo || nuʔa || i || de || ni || iri
|-
! fire
| erei / eria || era || i || tae || si || iʔau
|-
! dog
| kumi / kumo || umu || ka || gaha || haɔ || oroko
|-
! bird
| kumi / kumo || kikio || ka || tipemu || ba || nako
|-
! water
| ubi / uburo || obo || u || ogo || węi || ere
|-
! earth
| ei / ero || hepu || pɛkɛ / hapu || goʔeto || hae || kae
|-
! base
| makiri / makiro || mabu || mate || kama || baale || ʔaia
|-
! sago
| i / iro || du || kɛi || du || o || pu
|-
! 1s pronoun
| ámò || mo || i / na || no || e̜ || na
|-
! 2s pronoun
| do || ro || iki / ka || vo (< ɣo) || ya̜ || ni
|-
! 3s pronoun
| da || nu || a || ete / itu / eto || a̜ || u
|-
! 1p pronoun
| àmò || nimo || name || ni || da̜ || ene
|-
! 2p pronoun
| a || rio || kame || ho || dia̜ || noro
|-
! 3p pronoun
| abo || ni || ame || iti || atima || oro
|}

Comparison of Porome's phonological inventory with those of neighboring languages:

{| class="wikitable"
! language !! no. of consonants !! no. of vowels !! /h/ !! /ʔ/
|-
! Porome
| 9 || 5 ||  || 
|-
! Baimuru
| 7 || 5 ||  || 
|-
! Rumu
| 8 || 7 ||  || 
|-
! Kope
| 10 || 5 ||  || 
|-
! Urama
| 12 || 5 ||  || 
|-
! Kerewo
| 13 || 5 ||  || 
|}

References

Languages of Gulf Province
Papuan languages
Language isolates of New Guinea